George James Tsunis (Greek: Γεώργιος Δημητρίου Τσούνης) (born December 26, 1967) is an American lawyer and businessman who is the current United States Ambassador to Greece. He was nominated by President Joe Biden to serve in the role on October 8, 2021, confirmed by the United States Senate on March 10, 2022, and began serving on May 10, 2022.

He was previously a nominee to be the U.S. ambassador to Norway by President Barack Obama, although his nomination ultimately failed.

Biography
Tsunis was born 1967 in Queens, New York, and is the son of first-generation immigrants from Greece, James and Eleni Tsunis. He graduated from Commack High School in Commack, New York in 1985.

He earned a Bachelor of Arts degree in classic studies at New York University in 1989, and a Juris Doctor from St. John's University School of Law in 1992.

Tsunis was raised in the Greek Orthodox faith. On March 15, 2021, he was appointed co-vice chairman of the Greek Orthodox America Archdiocese’s National Coordinating Committee. Also, he's been awarded the Saint Paul’s Medal, the Greek Orthodox Church of America’s highest recognition for a layperson. 

Tsunis speaks English and Greek.

Career
As a practicing attorney, Tsunis was a partner at the law firm Rivkin Radler LLP. He married Greek-American Olga J. Antzoulis in November 2004 and had his first child, James in 2007. They live in Lloyd Harbor, Long Island, with their three children. He has two sisters.

Nomination as U.S. ambassador to Norway
Tsunis was nominated as Ambassador to Norway on September 10, 2013. His nomination was part of a backlog of nominees for ambassador positions across the world. Norway had never been without a US ambassador for as long.

Tsunis' nomination hearing generated controversy, both in Norway and in the USA, due to his confession of never having been to Norway, and his apparent ignorance of Norwegian political issues. According to some sources, the U.S. Embassy apologized for some statements to the Norwegian government and other involved parties in Norway.

In statements to the press in December 2014, Tsunis indicated that he was no longer seeking the nomination as ambassador to Norway.

U.S. ambassador to Greece
Tsunis was nominated to be the next U.S. ambassador to Greece on October 8, 2021, by President Biden. Hearings were held before the Senate Foreign Relations Committee on January 12, 2022. On March 8, 2022, the committee reported his nomination favorably to the Senate floor. Tsunis was officially confirmed by the entire Senate on March 10, 2022, by voice vote.

Greek President Katerina Sakellaropoulou, accepted his credentials on May 10, 2022 in Presidential Mansion, Athens.

References

1967 births
Living people
20th-century American businesspeople
20th-century American lawyers
21st-century American businesspeople
21st-century American diplomats
21st-century American lawyers
Ambassadors of the United States to Greece
American people of Greek descent
Greek Orthodox Christians from the United States
New York University alumni
St. John's University (New York City) alumni